Hack Club is a global nonprofit network of high school computer hackers, makers and coders. Founded in 2014 by Zach Latta, it now includes 400 high school clubs and 20,000 students. It has been featured on the TODAY Show, and profiled in the Wall Street Journal and many other publications.

Programs 

Hack Club's primary focus is its clubs program, in which it supports high school coding clubs through learning resources and mentorship. It also runs / has run a series of other programs and events. 

A few notable programs and events are:

 Hack Club Bank - a fiscal sponsorship program originally targeted at high school hacker events
 AMAs - video calls with industry experts such as Elon Musk and Vitalik Buterin
 Summer of Making - a collaboration with GitHub, Adafruit & Arduino to create an online summer program for teenagers during the COVID-19 pandemic that included $50k in hardware donations to teen hackers around the world
 The Hacker Zephyr - a cross-country hackathon on a train across America. 
 Assemble - the first high school hackathon in San Francisco since the pandemic, with the stated goal of "kick[ing] off a hackathon renaissance".
 Epoch - A global high schooler-led hackathon in Delhi NCR organised in public to inspire the community of student hackers and bring hundreds of teenagers together.
 Winter Wonderland Hardware - An online winter program where teenagers submit their idea of a project and if accepted they get upto $250 grant for their hardware that is required in the project.

Funding 
Hack Club is funded by grants from philanthropic organizations and donations from individual supporters. In 2019, GitHub Education provided cash grants of up to $500 to every Hack Club "hackathon" event. In May 2020, GitHub committed to a $50K hardware fund, globally alongside Arduino and Adafruit, to deliver hardware tools directly to students’ homes with a program named Hack Club Summer of Making. In 2020, Elon Musk and the Musk Foundation donated $500,000 to help expand Hack Club, and donated another $1,000,000 in 2021. In 2022, Tom and Theresa Preston-Werner donated $500,000 to Hack Club.

References 

Hacker_culture
Clubs and societies
Computer programming
2014 establishments in Vermont